Victor Joseph "Biff" Schlitzer (December 4, 1884 – January 4, 1948) was a pitcher in Major League Baseball who played from  through  for the Philadelphia Athletics (1908–09) and Boston Red Sox (1909) of the American League, and with the Buffalo Buffeds of the Federal League (1914). A native of Rochester, New York, he attended University of Dayton.

In a three-season career, Schlitzer posted a 10–15 record with 87 strikeouts and a 3.60 earned run average in 44 appearances, including 29 starts, 16 complete games, two shutouts, one save, and  innings of work.

Schlitzer died on January 4, 1948, at the age of 63 in Wellesley, Massachusetts. He is buried at Forest Hill Cemetery in Utica, New York.

References

External links

Retrosheet

Boston Red Sox players
Buffalo Buffeds players
Philadelphia Athletics players
Major League Baseball pitchers
Dayton Flyers baseball players
Baseball players from New York (state)
Rochester Bronchos players
Troy Trojans (minor league) players
Utica Pent-Ups players
Chattanooga Lookouts players
Indianapolis Indians players
Kansas City Blues (baseball) players
Omaha Rourkes players
Toledo Mud Hens players
Matanzas players
Sportspeople from Rochester, New York
1884 births
1948 deaths
American expatriate baseball players in Cuba
20th-century African-American people
Burials at Forest Hill Cemetery (Utica, New York)